The Calumet-Saganashkee Channel, usually shortened to the Cal-Sag Channel, is a  canal in southern Cook County, Illinois, operated by the Metropolitan Water Reclamation District of Greater Chicago. Constructed between 1911 and 1922, it connects the Little Calumet River to the Chicago Sanitary and Ship Canal. Between 1955 and 1958 the channel was widened by the Army Corps of Engineers to the current .

The Cal-Sag Channel serves barge traffic in what was an active zone of heavy industry in the far southern neighborhoods of the city of Chicago and adjacent suburbs. As of 2006 it was also used more as a conduit for wastewater from southern Cook County, including the Chicago-area Deep Tunnel Project, into the Illinois Waterway. It is also used by pleasure crafts in the summer time.

The western  of the channel flow through the Palos Forest Preserve, a large area of parkland operated by the Forest Preserve District of Cook County.

The Cal-Sag Channel served as the rowing venue for the 1959 Pan American Games.

When it is completed, the Calumet-Sag Trail, a  greenway, will border the channel and will stretch from the Chicago Sanitary and Ship Canal to the Burnham Greenway.

References

External links
Cal-Sag Channel, Calumet Water Reclamation Plant turn 100

Canals opened in 1922
Canals in Illinois